is a concrete single arch bridge across the Kanda River in Chiyoda, Tokyo. The bridge carries National Route 17 across the Kanda River. Two public transport stations and a police station nearby are named after the bridge.

Various bridges made of wood or stone were the predecessors to the current bridge, which stands at the location of what was once one of Tokyo's city gates. The latest bridge was constructed in 1930.

See also
 Manseibashi Station

References

Arch bridges in Japan
Bridges completed in 1930
Buildings and structures in Chiyoda, Tokyo
Concrete bridges